Simpang Tiga is a small township in Bagan Datuk District, Perak, Malaysia. This Township is formed by only a few rows of shop houses and a few hundred families, most of them farmers. This township is also the hometown for the Parliament Member of Bagan Datoh and the Deputy Minister of Tourism.

Education 

There are only two primary schools in this township: a Sekolah Kebangsaan (Malay School) and a Sekolah Jenis Kebangsaan (Chinese School). The educational guideline use by both schools is the same; the only difference is the language.

Attractions 

Fishing for "Ikan Haruan" is one of the attractions in this township. It is also famous for its Mee Rebus Sin Lok Hooi, a dish with noodles, deep fried shrimp dough, egg, tofu, and a special sauce.

Bagan Datuk District
Populated places in Perak